The 1989 Women's Champions Trophy is the 2nd edition of Hockey Champions Trophy for women. It was held from September 3–10, 1989 in Frankfurt, West Germany.

Squads

 Maree Fish (GK)
 Christine Dobson
 Juliet Haslam
 Vanessa Barnes
 Angela Kaaks (GK)
 Michelle Capes
 Alison Peek
 Lisa Powell
 Lee Capes
 Kim Small
 Sally Carbon
 Jackie Pereira
 Tracey Belbin
 Rechelle Hawkes
 Sharon Patmore (c)
 Kim Rayner

 Deb Whitten (GK)
 Tina Farrar
 Deb Covey
 Sue Bond
 Carmen Kirkness
 Sandra Levy
 Rochelle Low
 Melanie Slade
 Joan Robere
 Joel Brough
 Michelle Conn
 Laurelee Kopeck
 Bernie Casey
 Milena Gaiga
 Sara Ballantyne
 Sharon Creelman (c)

 Jill Atkins
 Valerie Hallam (GK)
 Gill Brown
 Karen Brown
 Mary Nevill (c)
 Julie Elms (GK)
 Vickey Dixon
 Wendy Fraser
 Sandy Lister
 Gill Messenger
 Tracy Fry
 Watkin Lynda
 Catherine Sterling
 Jane Sixsmith
 Kate Parker
 Alison Ramsay

 Carina Bleeker (GK)
 Jacqueline Toxopeus (GK)
 Willemijn Duyster
 Annemieke Fokke
 Terry Sibbing
 Mieketine Wouters
 Caroline Leenders
 Daniëlle Koenen
 Ingrid Wolff
 Anneloes Nieuwenhuizen (c)
 Suzan van der Wielen
 Simone van Haarlem
 Ingrid Appels
 Helen Lejuene
 Florentine Steenberghe
 Wietske de Ruiter

 You Jae-sook (GK)
 Han Gum-shil
 Chang Eun-jung
 Hee Kim-kuk
 Kim Soon-duk
 Son Jeong-im
 Baek Beon-a
 Kim Hyun
 Soon Cho-kyu
 Jin Won-sim
 Kwon Chang-sook
 Yang Hea-sook
 Kim Young-sook
 Young Ku-mun
 Lim Kye-sook (c)
 Kim Hyung-soon

 Susie Wollschläger (c, GK)
 Bianca Weiß (GK)
 Caren Jungjohann
 Anke Wild
 Eva Hagenbäumer
 Kristina Peters
 Irina Kuhnt
 Tanja Dickenscheid
 Heike Gehrmann
 Melanie Cremer
 Philippa Suxdorf
 Britta Becker
 Christine Ferneck
 Franziska Hentschel
 Dana Schurmann
 Katrin Kauschke

Results

Pool standings

Matches

Statistics

Final standings

Goalscorers

External links
 Official FIH website

1989
1989 in women's field hockey
International women's field hockey competitions hosted by Germany
field hockey
Sports competitions in Frankfurt
September 1989 sports events in Europe
1980s in Frankfurt